Dachepalle town is the Municipality in Palnadu district of the Indian state of Andhra Pradesh.Town is the second lime city of India. It is the headquarters of Dachepalle mandal.

Geography 
Naguleru stream is the source of water for the villages.

Governance 

Dachepalle municipality is the local government. It is divided into wards and each ward is represented by a corporator.

Education 

As per the school information report for the academic year 2018–19, the village has a total of 16 schools. These schools include one KGBV, one model, 4 private, 7 MPP and three other type of schools.

References 

Villages in Palnadu district